Acervus is a genus of fungi in the family Pyronemataceae. Fruitbodies occur on soil, duff, and plant debris. Six of the seven species in the genus are found in China.

References

Pezizales genera
Pyronemataceae